The Fleetwings BT-12 Sophomore, also known by the company designation Model 23, was a 1940s all-metal basic training monoplane built by Fleetwings for the United States Army Air Forces. Only 24 production examples of the type were built before the contract was cancelled.

Design and development
With the outbreak of the Second World War, the United States Army Air Corps (later U.S. Army Air Forces) was ill-prepared for a major war. In an effort to obtain as many aircraft as possible the USAAF contracted Fleetwings, a specialist fabricator of sheet stainless steel, to produce a basic training monoplane. A prototype Model 23 was ordered as the XBT-12 during 1939.

The XBT-12 was an all-metal low-wing cantilever monoplane with a fixed tailwheel landing gear and powered by a Pratt & Whitney R-985 engine. The aircraft had two identical tandem cockpits for instructor and pupil covered by a continuous canopy. It was the first military aircraft to be constructed primarily from welded stainless steel.

Operational history
After evaluation of the XBT-12 starting in late 1939, an order for 176 production aircraft, designated BT-12, was placed. Only 24 aircraft were delivered, one in 1942 and 23 in 1943, before the contract was cancelled, the Vultee BT-13 being preferred.

Variants
XBT-12
Army designation for the prototype Model 23, one built.
BT-12
Army designation for the production Model 23, 24 built, 152 cancelled.

Operators

United States Army Air Forces

Specifications (BT-12)

See also

References
Notes

Bibliography

 The Illustrated Encyclopedia of Aircraft (Part Work 1982-1985), 1985, Orbis Publishing

Further reading

BT-12
1940s United States military trainer aircraft
Single-engined tractor aircraft
Low-wing aircraft
Aircraft first flown in 1939